Antal Majnek, OFM (November 18, 1951 in Budapest, Hungary) is the Roman Catholic bishop emeritus of the diocese of Mukachevo.

Biography

In 1977 he joined the Franciscan Order in Hungary. On April 17, 1982 Majnek was ordained priest in Budapest. In 1989 he began missionary work in Ukraine.

Episcopate

On December 9, 1995 he was appointed auxiliary bishop of Transcarpathia and to the titular see of Febiana. On January 6, 1996, Pope John Paul II ordained him bishop. Since 1997, he served as Apostolic Administrator of Transcarpathia. On March 27, 2002 he was appointed to the diocese of Mukachevo. On January 28, 2011, the Holy See announced that Pope Francis had accepted Majnek's resignation.

References

External links

 Antal Majnek - diocesan bishop of Mukachevo
Bishop Antal Majnek, O.F.M. 
Diocese of Mukacheve 

1951 births
Living people
Hungarian Friars Minor
Hungarian people of Polish descent
Clergy from Budapest
Ukrainian Roman Catholic bishops
Franciscan bishops